Chicken Française (or Chicken Francese) is an Italian-American dish of flour-dredged, egg-dipped, sautéed chicken cutlets with a lemon-butter and white wine sauce. The dish is popular in the region surrounding Rochester, New York, where it is known as Chicken French, to the point that some have suggested the dish be called Chicken Rochester. When Italian immigrants arrived in Rochester, they brought their recipes with them, including veal francese, but they substituted chicken for the more expensive veal.  
Another source says that Veal Francese had been popular in the region since the 1950s, but when consumers boycotted veal in the 1970s, area chefs like James Cianciola of the Brown Derby Restaurant successfully substituted chicken. Cianciola credits chefs Tony Mammano and Joe Cairo with bringing the dish from New York City.

Despite being such a well-known dish in Italian-American culture, francese is not a classical dish or sauce. There are no written recipes that mark the origin of this dish.

Artichokes French is a common variation using artichoke hearts instead of chicken. Artichokes French is often served as an appetizer.

See also
 Piccata
 List of chicken dishes
 Italian-American cuisine

References

French
Italian-American cuisine
Culture of Rochester, New York
Cuisine of New York (state)